Killona is a census-designated place (CDP) in St. Charles Parish, Louisiana, United States. The population was 724 in 2020. On December 14, 2022, the town was hit by a destructive and deadly EF2 tornado that damaged or destroyed numerous structures, killed one person, and injured eight others.

Geography
Killona is located at  (29.999471, -90.487081).

Demographics

Education
St. Charles Parish Public School System operates public schools:
Hahnville High School in Boutte

Place of interest
Killona is home to the following:
Waterford 3—Operated by Entergy Nuclear, Waterford Nuclear Generating Station (aka Waterford 3), produces roughly 10% of power for the state of Louisiana.

References

Census-designated places in Louisiana
Census-designated places in St. Charles Parish, Louisiana
Census-designated places in New Orleans metropolitan area
Louisiana populated places on the Mississippi River